Gao Lin (born 13 October 1969) is a Chinese volleyball player. She competed in the women's tournament at the 1992 Summer Olympics.

References

1969 births
Living people
Chinese women's volleyball players
Olympic volleyball players of China
Volleyball players at the 1992 Summer Olympics
Place of birth missing (living people)
20th-century Chinese women